David or Dave Nelson may refer to:

Academia 

 David Nelson (abolitionist) (1793–1844), founder of Marion College and Mission Institute, Presbyterian minister
 David Robert Nelson (born 1951), American physicist, professor of biophysics at Harvard University
 David L. Nelson (born 1956), American human geneticist
 David Nelson (mathematician) (born 1938), English mathematician

Arts and entertainment
 Dave Nelson (trumpeter) (1905–1946), American jazz trumpeter
 David Nelson (musician) (born 1943), American guitarist
 David Nelson (actor) (1936–2011), American actor, director, and producer
 David Nelson, member of The Last Poets
 Dave Nelson, guitarist with Nektar

Law and politics
 David Aldrich Nelson (1932–2010), United States federal judge
 David Sutherland Nelson (1933–1998), United States federal judge
 David Nelson (Alaska politician) (born 1996), Alaska state representative
 David Nelson (Oregon politician) (born 1941), Oregon state senator
 David Nelson (Idaho politician), Idaho state senator
 David R. Nelson (politician) (born 1942), Massachusetts state representative
 David D. Nelson (born 1956), United States Ambassador to Uruguay, 2009–2011
 David Nelson (Utah activist) (born 1962), American activist for the protection of equal rights for LGBT people

Sports
 Dave Nelson (Australian footballer) (1910–1986), Australian rules footballer
 Dave Nelson (1944–2018), American baseball player and sportscaster
 Dave Nelson (curler) (born 1974), American curler
 David M. Nelson (1920–1991), American football coach
 David Nelson (wide receiver) (born 1986), American football wide receiver
 David Nelson (running back) (born 1963), American football running back
 David Nelson (footballer) (1918–1988), Scottish professional footballer
 David Nelson (hurdler) (born 1967), British athlete and medallist in athletics at the 1990 Commonwealth Games
 David Nelson (rugby league) (1962–2001), English rugby league footballer who played in the 1980s and 1990s
 David Nelson (gamer) (born 1974), American electronic sports player
 David Stergakos or David Nelson (born 1956), Greek-American basketball player

Other
 David Nelson (botanical collector) (died 1789), British botanical collector, crewmember of HMS Bounty
 David Nelson (VC) (1886–1918), Irish recipient of the Victoria Cross
 David Nelson (software developer) (born 1993), American software developer
 David Nelson, inventor of the current-feedback operational amplifier